is a historically Japanese copper alloy, a member of the irogane class, which is patinated into a range of subtle greys and muted shades of blue, green, and brown, through the use of niiro processes, involving the rokushō compound.

Naming
Shibuichi means "one-fourth" in Japanese, and indicates the standard formulation of one part silver to three parts copper, though this may vary considerably according to the desired effect.
Several major variants of the alloy have specific names, as detailed below. In addition, the metal in general, and especially the paler shades, may be named rogin.

Composition
Aside from the basic 25% silver to 75% copper mix, combinations as divergent as 5% silver to 95% copper are also marketed as "shibuichi". A wide range of colours can be achieved using the whole range of alloy compositions, even above 50% silver, e.g. 90% copper and 10% silver for a dark grey and down to 70% copper and 30% silver for lighter greys.

Kuro-Shibuichi (Kin-IchibuSashi)

Kuro is black in Japanese and kuro-shibuichi is different from other variants in the table, being a mixture of shibuichi (~40%) and shakudō (~60%) with around 1% of gold (proportions could be, for example, 9.9% silver, 87.3% copper, and 2.8% gold). Kuro-shibuichi will develop a black patina which is different from the black patina of shakudo.

It is a common misconception that both copper and silver oxides form, but in fact a detailed study has shown that only copper oxides are formed on the copper rich regions of the material's microstructure, while the silver rich regions are left largely untouched.

History
The first official mention of the material is from the early 18th century, in documents from the State Mint, though it is believed to have existed before that.  For most of its history, shibuichi was mostly used to ornament various fittings for Japanese swords until the Meiji reforms, when most swordmakers began to make purely decorative objects instead. The material is often used in mokume-gane combinations.  Similar alloys have been used elsewhere but the use of shibuichi to achieve different colored patinas appears to have remained nearly unknown outside Japan, until recent interest from artisans in the West.

See also

 
 
 
 
  (Black bronze)

References

External links
Reactive Metal Studio Inc. -- Shakudo & Shibuichi Data Sheet

Irogane
Precious metal alloys
Silver
Copper